Xanadu Quantum Technologies is a Canadian quantum computing hardware and software company headquartered in Toronto, Ontario. The company develops cloud accessible photonic quantum computers  and develops open-source software for quantum machine learning and simulating quantum photonic devices.

History 
Xanadu was founded in 2016 by Christian Weedbrook and was a participant in the Creative Destruction Lab's accelerator program. Since then, Xanadu has raised a total of US$245M in funding with venture capital financing from Bessemer Venture Partners, Capricorn Investment Group, Tiger Global Management, In-Q-Tel, Business Development Bank of Canada, OMERS Ventures, Georgian, Real Ventures, Golden Ventures and Radical Ventures and innovation grants from Sustainable Development Technology Canada and DARPA.

Technology 
Xanadu's hardware efforts have been focused on developing programmable Gaussian boson sampling (GBS) devices. GBS is a generalization of boson sampling, which traditionally uses single photons as an input; GBS uses squeezed states of light. In 2020, Xanadu published a blueprint for building a fault-tolerant quantum computer using photonic technology.

In June 2022 Xanadu has reported on a boson sampling experiment summing up to those of Google and University of Science and Technology of China (USTC), their setup used loops of optical fiber and multiplexing to replace the network of beam splitters by a single one which made it also more easily reconfigurable. They detected a mean of 125 up to 219 photon from 216 squeezed modes (squeezed light follows a photon number distribution so they can contain more than one photon per mode) and claim to have obtained a speedup 50 million times bigger than previous experiments.

References

External links 
 Official website

2016 establishments in Ontario
Quantum computing
Photonics
Photonics companies
Quantum information science
Companies involved in quantum computing